Jussi Heikkinen (born 19 July 1988 in Hämeenlinna) is a Finnish football player currently playing for FC Lahti.

References
Guardian Football.

1988 births
Living people
People from Hämeenlinna
FC Lahti players
Finnish footballers
Association football defenders
Sportspeople from Kanta-Häme